The Office of Innovation and Improvement (OII) was a federal agency responsible for managing innovation grants and policy for the United States Department of Education. On March 13, 2017, Executive Order 13781—the Comprehensive Plan for Reorganizing the Executive Branch–merged the OII into the Office of Elementary and Secondary Education. 

Grants managed by OII included:
 Investing in Innovation (i3)
 Arts in Education National Program
 Charter Schools Program Grants for Replication and Expansion of High-Quality Charter Schools
 Promise Neighborhoods

References

External links
 

United States Department of Education